West Virginian of the Year is an annual selection by the editorial board of the Charleston Gazette (the combined board of that paper and the Charleston Daily Mail between 1961 and 1991) of the individual who best shows the "spirit of West Virginia".  The winner can either be a native West Virginian who achieved after leaving the state, or a person living in the state for achievements in the state.  The winner is announced in the last Sunday edition of the Charleston Gazette-Mail. It is considered similar to the Time Magazine person of the year award, on a state basis.

Winners
1951: Okey Patteson, governor, advocated construction of West Virginia Turnpike
1952: Walter S. Hallanan, editor of Huntington Herald-Dispatch, chairman of the 1952 Republican National Convention
1953: Felix Stump, admiral, USN, commander of United States Pacific Fleet
1954: Chuck Yeager, general, USAF, test pilot
1955: Leonard Riggleman, president Morris Harvey College
1956: John Hoblitzell, Jr., senator, education advocate
1957: Michael Benedum, oil "wildcatter" donated fortune to a foundation for state improvement
1958: William Thompson, state trial court judge, advocated probation
1959: Jerry West basketball (WVU lost the NCAA Final) and Sam Huff football (New York Giants lost the NFL Championship), athletes at West Virginia University
1960: Fred Otto, civic leader, saved local DuPont plant from closure
1961: Charles Hodell, editor of Raleigh Register and Beckley Post-Herald, orphan with a disability
1962: Pearl Buck, author, won Nobel Prize
1963: Cyrus Vance, diplomat
1964: Jennings Randolph, senator, advocated Appalachian Regional Commission
1965: Leon Sullivan, minister, advocated affirmative action
1966: Walter Reuther, labor leader, president United Auto Workers
1967: Hilarion Cann, Fred Holloway, Samuel Cooper, & Wilburn C. Campbell, religious ministers, advocated affirmative action
1968: Phyllis Curtin and George Crumb, opera singer and composer
1969: Daniel Hale, physician and conservationist, advocated construction of flood control dams and clean water supply systems
1970: William Brotherton, state senate president, opposed corruption
1971: John Norman, physician, researcher in heart disease
1972: Arch Moore, governor, cited for "dynamic first term"
1973: Arnold Miller, labor leader, overthrew corrupt administration of United Mine Workers
1974: Robert Byrd, senator, named chairman of Senate Appropriations Committee
1975: James Harlow, physicist, president, West Virginia University
1976: James David Barber, political scientist Duke University, author
1977: Robert Byrd (2nd award), named Senate Majority Leader
1978: Mary Lee Settle, author
1979: Maurice Brooks, biologist, West Virginia University
1980: Charles Peters, political commentator, editor of Washington Monthly
1981: Sharon Rockefeller, state first lady, advocated PBS
1982: Arthur Recht, state trial court judge, ruled state school funding system unconstitutional
1983: James "Buck" Harless, timber and coal company owner, donated much of his fortune to Marshall University and other state projects
1984: Mary Lou Retton, gymnast, won gold medal at 1984 Summer Olympics
1985: Louise McNeill, poet
1986: Dale Nitzchke, president, Marshall University
1987: Roberta Emerson, curator, Huntington Museum of Art
1988: Don Nehlen, football coach at 11-1 West Virginia University
1989: Michael Carey, lawyer, United States Attorney, fought Democratic Party machine corruption in Mingo County, West Virginia
1990: Robert Byrd (3rd award), for appropriation "earmarks"
1991: Jay Rockefeller, senator
1992: Lyell Clay, Hazel Ruby McQuain, Charlie Erickson, Joan C. Edwards and "other philanthropists", for donations to state projects
1993: 1993 West Virginia Mountaineers football team, which went 11-1
1994: Henry Louis Gates, professor, Harvard University
1995: Robert Frasure, diplomat, Assistant Secretary of State, for work in Bosnia
1996: Gaston Caperton, governor, cited for "having few scandals"
1997: Elizabeth Hallanan, federal judge, found a school prayer unconstitutional (decision later overruled by United States Supreme Court)
1998: Thomas J. Lopez, admiral, USN, commander of Navy in Bosnia
1999: Bob Pruett and 1999 Marshall Thundering Herd football team, which went 13-0
2000: John T. Chambers, businessman, founder of Cisco
2001: West Virginia National Guard
2002: Robert Byrd (4th award) for opposing Operation Iraqi Freedom
2003: Jessica Lynch, private, USA, briefly a Prisoner of War
2004: Charlie Jones, businessman, owner of coal barge company
2005: "West Virginia Soldiers and their families"
2006: David Hardesty, president, West Virginia University
2007: Jennifer Garner, actress
2008: Betty Schoenbaum, widow of founder of Shoney's, philanthropist
2009: Jim Justice, businessman, saved The Greenbrier from bankruptcy
2010: Allen Tackett, general, WVANG
2011: Landau Eugene Murphy, Jr., singer, won America's Got Talent
2012: Dan Foster, legislator and medical doctor, supported single-payer health care system
2013: Boy Scouts of America, built large campground near Fayetteville

References
http://www.wvgazette.com/News/201112310064?page=2&build=cache

West Virginia culture